Shouleh Nikzad is an Iranian-American electronic engineer and research scientist at the Jet Propulsion Laboratory. She leads the Advanced Detector Arrays, Systems, and Nanoscience Group. Her research considers ultraviolet and low-energy particle detectors, nanostructure devices and novel spectrometers. Nikzad is a Fellow of the American Physical Society, the National Academy of Inventors and SPIE.

Early life and education 
As an undergraduate, Nikzad majored in electronic engineering at the University of Southern California. She moved to California Institute of Technology for graduate studies, where she earned her Ph.D. in 1983. Nikzad investigated compound materials (including zinc sulfide and cadmium sulfide) that had been produced through ion beam sputtering using laser spectroscopy.

Research and career 
Nikzad was appointed an electro-optics engineer at Pacific Infrared. She moved to the Argonne National Laboratory as a graduate fellow in 1998, before joining California Institute of Technology as a postdoctoral fellow in 1990. After two years at Caltech, Nikzad moved to Jet Propulsion Laboratory (JPL), where she focused on imaging and detector systems. At the JPL, Nikzad designed curved imaging systems, which, inspired by the human eye, can support high quality imaging in large telescopes.

As of 2019, Nikzad is a Senior Research Scientist and Principal Engineer at JPL where she leads the Advanced Detector Arrays, Systems, and Nanoscience Group.

Awards and honors 
 1997 Lew Allen Award of Excellence
 2011 IEEE Pioneer Electrical Engineer
 2012 Elected Fellow of the American Physical Society
 2013 SPIE Women in Optics Planner
 2017 Elected Fellow of the National Academy of Inventors
 2019 Institute of Electrical and Electronics Engineers Photonics Distinguished Lecturer
 2020 NASA Outstanding Leadership Medal
 2021 SPIE Aden and Marjorie Meinel Technology Achievement Award

Selected publications

References 

Year of birth missing (living people)
Living people
University of Southern California alumni
California Institute of Technology alumni
American women scientists
21st-century American women
Fellows of the American Physical Society